Arsh Shah Dilbagi (born March 26, 1998) is an Indian scientist, Inventor and Roboticist . He completed his undergraduate at Princeton University studying Operations Research and Financial Engineering. He is the founder of Arido about which very little has been made public.

Career

2015 
 In August 2015, he established an exhibit housing a quadruped robot dog, at the Science and Innovation Museum in Presidential Residence at New Delhi. The exhibit is named 'A Day in the Life of a Robot Dog - CLUMSY'.

2014 

 In 2014, he developed  'TALK' which won the Voters' Choice Award at Google Science Fair 2014.

Notable work

2016 

CLUMSY,  A quadruped robot with 16 Servo Motors.

2014 
 TALK, an Assistive Device to convert breath into speech. It uses the variations in person's breath help him either dictate letters which are further combined and synthesised as sentences or speak-out specific commands/phrases depending on the mode selected.

Notable awards

2015 

Intel International Science and Engineering Fair (ISEF): Third Grand Award in the Embedded Systems Category, conferred by Intel and Society for Science at Intel ISEF 2015 held at Pittsburgh, USA. and American Psychological Association (APA) Third place ($500) . and American Intellectual Property Law Association (AIPLA): first place at the same event.

2014 

Google Science Fair (GSF): Google Science Fair Voter’s Choice Award, conferred by Google Inc. at GSF 2014, held at Google HQ., Mountain View, California, USA.
 Special Mention (4th place) in the E-Inclusion & Accessibility category at Manthan Award, India Habitat Centre, New Delhi, India.
 Second position at i3 - Indian Innovation Initiative 2014 held at Noida Expo Mart, Noida, India.

2011
 INSPIRE Award: Winning the 1st Position in North Zone, India for project ‘Unmanned Ground Vehicle (UGV)’ in INSPIRE National Science Competition held at Pragati Maidan, New Delhi.

References

External links 
Official Website

Living people
Society for Science & the Public
20th-century Indian inventors
1998 births
Indian roboticists
Indian business speakers
Princeton University people
People from Panipat district
21st-century Indian inventors